The Tunica treasure is a group of artifacts from the Tunica-Biloxi tribe discovered in the 1960s. Their discovery led to a protracted legal battle over their ownership, and the eventual passage of the Native American Graves Protection and Repatriation Act.

Site 
Trudeau Landing, which is on the National Register of Historic Places, is located in Tunica, Louisiana.

Terminology 

The term Tunica treasure was introduced by archaeologist Jeffrey Brain, a name which he later came to regret.

Background 

In the spring of 1541 Hernando de Soto and his army approached the eastern bank of the Mississippi River, coming upon the Province of Quizquiz (pronounced "keys-key"). These people spoke a dialect of the Tunica language, which is a language isolate. At that time, these related groups covered a large region extending along both sides of the Mississippi River in present-day Mississippi and Arkansas, as the expedition would soon learn.

It was 150 years before another European group recorded the Tunica. In 1699 the LaSource expedition (coming downriver from French Canada) encountered the Tunica, describing them as a modestly sized tribe numbering only a few hundred warriors. They and other peoples had suffered from smallpox epidemics, which had high mortality rates as they had no natural immunity to this new disease carried by Europeans.

The Tunica were skilled traders and entrepreneurs, especially in the manufacture and distribution of salt, a valuable item to both native and Europeans.

By the early 18th century, the tribes along the lower Mississippi River were a target of Chickasaw raids for the English slave trade in South Carolina. By 1706 the Tunica decided to move.

As their enemies the Natchez were to their immediate south, they moved to the Mississippi side of the Mississippi and Red River confluence. This allowed them to keep control of their salt trade, as the Red River also connected to their salt source in the Caddoan areas.

They established a loose collection of hamlets and villages at present-day Angola, Louisiana. The archeological remains of a small hamlet from this time period were discovered in 1976 by an inmate of Angola Prison. It is known as the Bloodhound Site.

Tunica treasure 
In the 1960s, graves at the site were dug up by a local self-described treasure hunter, who worked as a guard at Louisiana State Prison (Angola). He took many artifacts from the area, which had been deposited as grave goods with the more than 100 graves. The Tunica felt that he had stolen tribal heirlooms and desecrated the graves of their ancestors and were outraged at the violations. He tried to sell the artifacts to the Peabody Museum at Harvard University, but the transaction stalled when the museum found that he did not have legal title to the items.

In the 1970s, the site was excavated by archaeologists, who uncovered large amounts of pottery, European trade goods, and other artifacts deposited as grave goods by the Tunica from 1731 to 1764 when they were in residence. With help from the State of Louisiana, the tribe filed a lawsuit to obtain the title to the artifacts.

A decade passed in the courts, but the ruling became a landmark in Native American history, and it helped lay the groundwork for new Federal legislation, the Native American Graves Protection and Repatriation Act, passed in 1990. It was also used to prove the ancient heritage of the Tunica peoples, and helped them to gain state and Federal recognition.

A museum to house the artifacts was built by the Tunica-Biloxi, in Marksville, Louisiana. They are using it also as a conservation and education center for preservation of their artifacts.

In the 1960s a treasure hunter named Leonard Charrier began searching for artifacts at the Trudeau Landing site in West Feliciana Parish, Louisiana. The Tunica, who felt he had stolen tribal heirlooms and desecrated the graves of their ancestors, were outraged.

In the 1970s the site was excavated by archaeologists, uncovering large amounts of pottery, European trade goods and other artifacts deposited as grave goods by the Tunica from 1731 to 1764 when they occupied the site. With help from the State of Louisiana, the tribe filed suit to gain title to the artifacts, which has subsequently become known as the "Tunica treasure". The case took a decade to be decided in the courts, but the ruling became a landmark in American Indian history. It helped to lay the groundwork for new federal legislation, the Native American Graves Protection and Repatriation Act (NAGPRA), passed in 1990.

Because the artifacts had been separated from the original burials and connections were lost, the tribe decided to build a museum to house these items. Members of the tribe were trained as conservators in order to repair damage done to the artifacts by the centuries underground and handling during the ten-year court battle. The museum was built in the shape of the ancient temple mounds of their people, with the earthen structure to take the symbolic place of the original burial underground. It opened in 1989 as The Tunica-Biloxi Regional Indian Center and Museum. Due to structural problems, it was closed in 1999, with plans for a new larger facility underway. Today the Tunica Treasure collection is housed in the Tunica-Biloxi Cultural and Educational Resources Center, a state-of-the-art facility that includes a library, conservation center, distance-learning center, conference facilities, tribal offices, and museum on the tribal reservation in Marksville. Eighty percent of the artifacts of the Tunica Treasure have been restored.

See also 
 List of sites and peoples visited by the Hernando de Soto Expedition
 Mississippian culture
 List of Mississippian sites
 Southeastern Ceremonial Complex
 Mound Builders

References

External links

 Indian Mounds Louisiana
 Tunica-Biloxi Tribe of Louisiana, official website
 Tunica-Biloxi History
 The Peabody Man, biography of Jeffrey Brain

American culture
American Indian reservations in Louisiana
Archaeological sites in Louisiana
Native American history of Louisiana
Native American tribes in Louisiana
Archaeological cultures of North America
United States federal Native American legislation